Krajinović is a Serbian and Croatian surname. Notable people with the surname include:

Filip Krajinović (born 1992), Serbian tennis player
Nikola Krajinović (born 1999), Croatian footballer

Croatian surnames
Serbian surnames
Patronymic surnames